Conran Octopus is a division of Octopus Publishing Group, a cross-platform illustrated book publisher. Including architecture, design and gardening. It was founded in 1984 by Sir Terence Conran and Paul Hamlyn, and publishes about eight titles a year. Conran's own book, The Essential Garden Book, co-authored with Dan Pearson, was one of those published by the company.

See also 
 List of largest UK book publishers

References

External links 
 Conran Octopus website

Book publishing companies of the United Kingdom
British design
Conran family
Lagardère Media